The 1968–69 Liga Leumit season saw Hapoel Tel Aviv win the title and qualify for the 1970 Asian Club Championship. Maccabi Sha'arayim and Hapoel Ramat Gan were relegated to Liga Alef. Mordechai Spiegler of Maccabi Netanya was the league's top scorer with 25 goals.

Final table

Results

References
Israel - List of final tables RSSSF

Liga Leumit seasons
Israel
1968–69 in Israeli football leagues